Rhampholeon boulengeri, also known commonly as Boulenger’s pygmy chameleon, is a species of lizard in the family Chamaeleonidae. The species is native to eastern Africa.

Etymology
The specific name, boulengeri, is in honor of Belgian-born British Herpetologist George Albert Boulenger.

Geographic range
R. boulengeri is found in Burundi, Democratic Republic of Congo, Kenya, Rwanda, Tanzania, and Uganda

Habitat

Diet
R. boulengeri preys on insects, including caterpillars, and also on spiders.

Reproduction
R. boulengeri is oviparous.

References

Further reading
Schmidt KP (1919). "Contributions to the Herpetology of the Belgian Congo Based on the Collection of the American Museum Congo Expedition, 1909–1915". Bulletin of the American Museum of Natural History 39 (2): 385–624 + Plates VII–XXXII. (Rhampholeon boulengeri, pp. 595–597 + Plate XXXII, figures 7 & 8).
Spawls S, Howell K, Hinkel H, Menegon M (2018). Field Guide to East African Reptiles, Second Edition. London: Bloomsbury Natural History. 624 pp. . (Rhampholeon boulengeri, p. 250).
Steindachner F (1911). "Vorläufiger Berichte über drei neue Arten aus der Familie Chamaeleontidae". Anzeiger der Kaiserlichen Akademie der Wissenschaften. Mathematisch-Naturwissenschaftliche Klasse 48 177–179. (Rhampholeon boulengeri, new species, p. 178). (in German).

Rhampholeon
Reptiles described in 1911
Taxa named by Franz Steindachner
Reptiles of Tanzania